Thysanoglossa is a genus of flowering plants from the orchid family, Orchidaceae. It contains three known species, all endemic to southeastern Brazil.

Thysanoglossa jordanensis Porto & Brade - São Paulo
Thysanoglossa organensis Brade - Rio de Janeiro
Thysanoglossa spiritu-sanctensis N.Sanson & Chiron - Espírito Santo

See also 
 List of Orchidaceae genera

References

External links 

Orchids of Brazil
Oncidiinae genera
Oncidiinae